H.R.H. is a novel written by Danielle Steel and published by  Delacorte Press in October 2006. The book is Steel's seventieth novel.

Synopsis
Princess Christianna's father, the Reigning Prince of Lichtenstein, has secure plans for Christianna's life, which is a burden almost unbearable to her.

After years at Berkley in America, Christianna returns home and realizes she cannot deal with the political responsibilities of being a Princess without feeling useless. With a purpose to change the ways of the world, she volunteers for the Red Cross in East Africa.

At an international relief camp, she finds her calling and a new love in the form of Parker Williams, a doctor from Doctors Without Borders. As they work together, she tries to hide her feelings and identity from him until in one shocking moment, her life changes forever.

After leaving the camp, her father has made a speech at the UN meeting while she was in Venice, where she secretly met Parker. Then, in a shocking turn of events, Christianna must reevaluate every decision she has ever made concerning her royal life. The rules began to change. Can Cristianna rule her country or would she say no?

Footnotes
http://www.randomhouse.com/features/steel/bookshelf/display.pperl?isbn=9780385338295

2006 American novels

American romance novels
Novels by Danielle Steel
Liechtenstein in fiction
Delacorte Press books